Khsach Kandal District is a district (srok) of Kandal Province, Cambodia. The district is subdivided into 18 communes (khum) such as Bak Dav, Chey Thum, Kampong Chamlang, Kaoh Chouram, Kaoh Oknha Tei, Preah Prasab, Preaek Ampil, Preaek Luong, Preaek Ta Kov, Preaek Ta Meak, Puk Ruessei, Roka Chonlueng, Sanlung, Sithor, Svay Chrum, Svay Romiet, Ta Aek, Vihear Suork and 93 villages (phum).

References

External links
Kandal at Royal Government of Cambodia website
Kandal at Ministry of Commerce website

Districts of Kandal province